Garry Chalk is a British-born Canadian actor. He has provided the voices for Optimus Primal of Beast Wars: Transformers and Beast Machines, as well as Optimus Prime in the anime English dubs of Transformers: Armada, Transformers Energon, and Transformers: Cybertron. He has lent his voice to over 30 animated television series and has been in films such as The Fly II, Godzilla and Freddy vs. Jason. He played the recurring role of Col. Chekov on Stargate SG-1. He is perhaps best known for his recurring role as Inspector Andrew Pawlachuk on Cold Squad.

Early life
Chalk was born in Southampton, Hampshire, England. At the age of 5, his family moved to Vancouver, British Columbia, Canada.

Career
Chalk has been involved with theatre since 1978 and has performed at the Vancouver Playhouse Theatre Company (VPTC), the Arts Club Theatre Company (ACTC), The Vancouver Theatresports League and various low budget theatres in Canada. The last live stage production he did was A Funny Thing Happened on the Way to the Forum, where he played Miles Gloriosus. He also performed in Henry IV and As You Like It at the VPTC, as well as Dracula and Passion at the ACTC.

Most of his career has been in film and television, usually portraying corrupt members of law enforcement. He had a recurring role on Cold Squad for four years, for which he won Gemini Awards in two consecutive years, and until the close of its ninth season had a recurring role on the science-fiction series Stargate SG-1. Known for his perfect enunciation and his mellifluous deep voice, Chalk is also a veteran of over 1,500 animated productions including Class of the Titans, and the 2002 remake of He-Man and the Masters of the Universe. He is also known for his voice work in the Transformers franchise as the voice of Optimus Primal in Beast Wars and Beast Machines, and as Optimus Prime in the Unicron Trilogy. He also voiced the original Megatron in an episode of Beast  Wars.

In the 2000s, he appeared in the Sci-Fi Channel shows Eureka, as Col. Briggs and Painkiller Jane, as Ruben Hennessey.

Filmography

Film

Television

Animation

 3-2-1 Penguins! – Sol, Bert/Cavitus
 ¡Mucha Lucha! – El Haystack Grande, Protozoa, El Kolor De Kurtz, Additional Voices
 Nellie the Elephant - Character Voices (US Dub)
 Action Man (1995) – Norris
 Action Man (2000) – Gangrene
 Penny Crayon - Dennis Pillbeam, Uncle Max
 Adventures of Sonic the Hedgehog – Grounder, Dragon Breath, Captain Rescue, Computer ("Grounder the Genius"), Professor Caninestein
 Alien Racers – Dravox 
 Animated Classic Showcase – Various Characters
 Barbie and the Rockers: Out of this World – Additional Voices
 Barbie of Swan Lake – Baker
 Barbie in the 12 Dancing Princesses – Desmond
 Barbie as the Island Princess – Frazer, Calvin
 Barbie Thumbelina – Louie
 Barbie in A Mermaid Tale – Brake
 Barbie in A Mermaid Tale 2 – Brake
 Beast Machines: Transformers – Optimus Primal
 Beast Wars: Transformers – Optimus Primal, Megatron G1 (episode 38)
 Being Ian – Mr. Cartwright
 Billy the Cat – Additional Voices
 Bucky O'Hare and the Toad Wars – Commander Dogstar, Al Negator
 Camp Candy – Additional Voices
 Captain N: The Game Master – King Hippo, Narrator, Donkey Kong, The Count, Bayou Billy, Malkil, Mayor Squaresly, Additional Voices
 Class of the Titans – Hercules and Ares
 Conan the Adventurer – Snagg, Gora, Conan's Father, Torrinon
 Dinosaur Train – Marco Megaraptor Dragon Ball: Curse of the Blood Rubies – King Gurumes (1996 BLT/Funimation dub)
 Dragon Tales – Mungus the Giant, The Gilded Dragon
 Dennis the Menace: Cruise Control – Hector
 Dragon Booster – Conner Penn/Mortis
 Eon Kid – Duke Von Rhymer
 Exosquad – Marsala, General Shiva
 Extreme Dinosaurs – Badrap
 Fat Dog Mendoza – Interpreter X, House Painter
 The Fearless Four – The Baron, The Miller, Platini, Guard #2
 Firehouse Tales – Additional Voices
 Funky Fables – Various Characters
 G.I. Joe: A Real American Hero – Pathfinder, Shockwave, Gristle, Metal-Head, Road Pig, Various Cobra Troopers
 G.I. Joe Extreme – Lieutenant Stone
 Gadget & the Gadgetinis – Additional Voices
 He-Man and the Masters of the Universe (2002) – Man-At-Arms (Duncan), Whiplash
 Hurricanes – Additional Voices
 Hello Carbot — Ace
 King Arthur and the Knights of Justice – Lord Viper, Warlord Bash, Sir Brick, Sir Phil
 Kissyfur – Additional Voices
 LeapFrog – Additional Voices
 Leo the Lion: King of the Jungle – Leo the Lion
 Madeline – Additional Voices
 Mama, Do You Love Me? – Papa
 Mega Man – Guts Man, Bright Man, Dark Man, Needle Man, Heat Man, Stone Man
 Mega Man: Fully Charged – Dr. Light
 Mosaic – Nathan Nelson
 Mummies Alive! – Referee, Old Man, Professor, Truck Driver, Movie Pharaoh, Yussef, Mr. Sullivan
 My Little Pony: Best Gift Ever – Prince Rutherford, Oak Nut, and Pony Vendor 3
 My Little Pony: Friendship Is Magic – Fido, Prince Rutherford
 Nexo Knights – General Magmar, Additional Voices
 Ninjago: Masters of Spinjitzu – Killow
 Pinky Dinky Doo – Librarian
 Pirate Express – Pontus, Ted
 Pocket Dragon Adventures – Sir Nigel
 Popeye's Voyage: The Quest for Pappy – Bluto
 ReBoot – Cyrus, Turbo, Slash, Al's Waiter, Herr Doktor
 RoboCop: Alpha Commando – Additional Voices
 RollBots – Captain Pounder
 Rudolph the Red-Nosed Reindeer and the Island of Misfit Toys – Santa Claus, Bumble the Abominable Snowman
 Rudolph the Red-Nosed Reindeer: The Movie – Blitzen
 Sabrina, the Animated Series – Additional Voices
 Scary Godmother: Halloween Spooktakular – Harry the Werewolf, Bug-A-Boo
 Scary Godmother: The Revenge of Jimmy – Harry the Werewolf, Bug-A-Boo
 Shadow Raiders – Emperor Femur
 Sitting Ducks – Jerry, Additional Voices
 Sleeping Beauty –  Misc
 Sonic Underground – Dr. Robotnik, Additional Voices
 Sonic's Christmas Blast - Grounder
 Spider-Man Unlimited – Mr. Meugniot, Additional Voices
 Stories from My Childhood – Various Characters
 Street Fighter – Dhalsim, Burke (Col. Keith Wolfman)
 Street Sharks – Spike, El Swordo
 The Adventures of Corduroy The Adventures of T-Rex – Bruno, Madder, Mayor Maynot
 The Baby Huey Show – Additional Voices
 The Colours of World - Captain Dark Colour
 The New Adventures of He-Man – He-Man, Artilla, President Pell, Alcon, Sgt. Krone, Andros, Gross
 Transformers: Armada – Optimus Prime
 Transformers: Energon – Optimus Prime
 Transformers: Cybertron – Optimus Prime
 Tom and Jerry: A Nutcracker Tale – The Evil King of Cats
 Voltron Force – Sky Marshall Wade, Manset
 Weird-Oh's – Uncle Huey
 What About Mimi? – Principal Earl

Video games

 Devil Kings – Devil King
 Ripley's Believe It or Not!: The Riddle of Master Lu – Robert Ripley (voice)
 Transformers: Beast Wars Transmetals – Optimus Primal
 Transformers – Optimus Prime
 The Godfather: The Game – Bruno Tattaglia, Luca Brasi
 Tomorrowland – Jail Desk Jockey

Awards
Gemini Awards
 2000–2001 Best Supporting Actor in a Drama Series: Cold Squad 2001–2002 Best Supporting Actor in a Drama Series: Cold Squad''

References

External links

 
 
 
 

Year of birth missing (living people)
Living people
Canadian people of English descent
20th-century Canadian male actors
21st-century Canadian male actors
Best Supporting Actor in a Drama Series Canadian Screen Award winners
Canadian male film actors
Canadian male Shakespearean actors
Canadian male stage actors
Canadian male television actors
Canadian male voice actors
English emigrants to Canada
Male actors from Vancouver
Male actors from Southampton
Canadian expatriates in England
English people of Canadian descent